Elections to Liverpool Town Council were held on Monday 1 November 1869. One third of the council seats were up for election, the term of office of each councillor being three years.

Six of the sixteen wards were uncontested.

After the election, the composition of the council was:

Election result

Because of the large number of uncontested seats, these statistics should be taken in that context.

Ward results

* - Retiring Councillor seeking re-election

Abercromby

Castle Street

Everton

Exchange

Great George

Lime Street

North Toxteth

Pitt Street

Rodney Street

St. Anne Street

St. Paul's

St. Peter's

Scotland

South Toxteth

Vauxhall

West Derby

By-elections

Aldermanic By Election, 9 November 1869

Following the retirement of Alderman Thomas Bold, Bernard Hall was elected as an alderman by the council on 9 November 1869.

No. 7, St. Peter's, 14 January 1870

Caused by the resignation of Councillor Jacob Gaitskell Brown (Liberal, St. Peter's, elected 1 November 1867) on 30 December 1869.

No. 2, Scotland, 3 February 1870

Caused by the resignation of Councillor Joseph Robinson (Liberal, Scotland, elected unopposed on 1 November 1867)

See also

 Liverpool City Council
 Liverpool Town Council elections 1835 - 1879
 Liverpool City Council elections 1880–present
 Mayors and Lord Mayors of Liverpool 1207 to present
 History of local government in England

References

1869
1869 English local elections
November 1869 events
1860s in Liverpool